The flat catfish (Cochlefelis insidiator) is a species of catfish in the family Ariidae. It was described by Patricia J. Kailola in 2000, originally under the genus Arius. It occurs in rivers, mudflats and marine waters on the coasts of Papua New Guinea and Australia.

References

Ariidae
Fish described in 2000